Simpulopsis is a genus of air-breathing land snails, terrestrial pulmonate gastropod mollusks in the family Simpulopsidae. 

Simpulopsis is the type genus of the tribe Simpulopsini and of the family Simpulopsidae.

Distribution 
The distribution of the genus Simpulopsis includes Colombia, Venezuela, Brazil and Ecuador.

Species 

Species within the genus Simpulopsis include:

subgenus Simpulopsis Beck, 1837
 Simpulopsis atrovirens (Moricand , 1836)
 Simpulopsis brasiliensis (Moricand , 1846)
 Simpulopsis corrugata Guppy, 1866
 Simpulopsis cumingi L. Pfeiffer, 1861
 Simpulopsis decussata Pfeiffer, 1856
 Simpulopsis miersi Pfeiffer, 1856
 Simpulopsis ovata (G.B. Sowerby I, 1822)
 Simpulopsis pseudosulculosa Breure, 1975
 Simpulopsis rufovirens (Moricand , 1846)
 Simpulopsis sulculosa (Férussac, 1821)
 Simpulopsis tryoni Pilsbry, 1899
 Simpulopsis wiebesi Breure, 1975

subgenus Eudioptus Albers, 1860
 Simpulopsis araujoi (Breure, 1975)
 Simpulopsis boissieri (Moricand , 1846)
 Simpulopsis citrinovitrea (Moricand , 1836) - synonym: Simpulopsis fulguratus Miller, 1878
 Simpulopsis ephippium Ancey, 1904
 Simpulopsis luteolus (Ancey, 1901)
 Simpulopsis progastor (d’Orbigny, 1835)
 Simpulopsis pseudosuccinea (Moricand , 1836)

No subgenus mentioned:
 Simpulopsis aenea L. Pfeiffer, 1861
 Simpulopsis dominicensis L. Pfeiffer, 1858
 Simpulopsis eudioptus (Ihering in Pilsbry, 1897)
 Simpulopsis gomesae Silva & Thomé, 2006
 Simpulopsis limpida (Drouët, 1859)
 Simpulopsis magnus Thompson, 1957
 Simpulopsis membranacea Villa & Villa, 1841
 Simpulopsis promatensis Silva & Thomé 2006
 Simpulopsis simula (Morelet, 1851)
 Simpulopsis vincentina E. A. Smith, 1895
Synonyms
 Simpulopsis chiapensis L. Pfeiffer, 1856: synonym of Xanthonyx chiapensis (L. Pfeiffer, 1856) (original combination)
 Simpulopsis cordovana L. Pfeiffer, 1857: synonym of Xanthonyx cordovanus (L. Pfeiffer, 1857) (original combination)
 Simpulopsis mastersi Brazier, 1872: synonym of Mystivagor mastersi (Brazier, 1872) (original combination)
 Simpulopsis portoricensis Shuttleworth, 1854: synonym of Platysuccinea portoricensis (Shuttleworth, 1854) (original combination)
 Simpulopsis salleana L. Pfeiffer, 1857: synonym of Xanthonyx salleanus (L. Pfeiffer, 1857) (original combination)

References

 Weyrauch, W.K. (1967). Descripciones y notas sobre gastropodos terrestres de Venezuela, Colombia, Ecuador, Brasil, y Peru. Acta Zoológica Lilloana, 21: 457-499.

Further reading 
 Pfeiffer L. (1846) "Die Gattungen Daudebardia, Simpulopsis, Vitrina und Succinea. In: Küster H. C. et al. (eds.). Systematisches Conchylien Cabinet von Martini und Chemnitz, J. H. Casselis, 1(part. 11): 1-59, pls. 1-6.

External links 
 Albers, J. C.; Martens, E. von. (1860). Die Heliceen nach natürlicher Verwandtschaft systematisch geordnet von Joh. Christ. Albers. Ed. 2. Pp. i-xviii, 1-359. Leipzig: Engelman
 Beck, H. (1837). Index molluscorum praesentis aevi musei principis augustissimi Christiani Frederici. 1-124. Hafniae 
 Gray J.E. (1847). A list of the genera of recent Mollusca, their synonyma and types. Proceedings of the Zoological Society of London. 15: 129-219
 Breure, A. S. H. & Araujo, R. (2017). The Neotropical land snails (Mollusca, Gastropoda) collected by the “Comisión Científica del Pacífico.”. PeerJ. 5, e3065

Simpulopsidae
Articles containing video clips